Khwasak was at the beginning of the 3rd century AD, the Satrap of Susa under the Parthian king Artabanus IV.

Khwasak is known from a stela found at Susa. The function of the stela is unknown but it might have been a tomb stone. The stela shows Khwasak and the king, who is handing over the ring of power to Khwasak. The Parthian text informs us that the stela was set up in the year AD 215. Susa was most likely in the 2nd century more or less an independent state. The inscription on the stela demonstrates that the city became at the beginning of the 3rd century again part of the Parthian empire with Khwasak as governor under king Artabanus IV.

Sources 
 D. T. Potts: The Archaeology of Elam: Formation and Transformation of an Ancient Iranian State, Cambridge University Press, Cambridge, 1999, ; p. 401-402

External links 
 Image of the stela (photograph is wrong way round)

People from the Parthian Empire
Satraps